José Fajardo may refer to:

 José Fajardo (footballer) (born 1993), Panamanian footballer
 José Fajardo (musician) (1919–2001), Cuban musician

See also
 José Clavijo y Fajardo